The Vingtaine du Sud (La Vîngtaine du Sud in Jèrriais) is one of the two vingtaines of the parish of St. Mary in Jersey in the Channel Islands.

References

Sud